Ceratoxanthis argentomixtana is a species of moth of the family Tortricidae. It is found in southern Russia (Sarepta), northern Syria (Marash) and Turkey.

The wingspan is about 23 mm. Adults have been recorded on wing in June.

References

Moths described in 1871
Cochylini